Conor James Grant (born 18 April 1995) is an English footballer who plays as a midfielder for Plymouth Argyle.

Career

Everton
Grant is a product of the Everton Academy, having been with the club since age 13. In July 2013, he signed his first professional contract at Everton having featured during the club's pre-season fixtures. His first involvement with the first team in a competitive fixture came on 11 December 2014, when he was named as a substitute against FC Krasnodar in the Europa League.

Motherwell (loan)
On 2 February 2015, Grant signed for Motherwell of the Scottish Premiership on a six-month loan, and 12 days later he made a scoring debut, curling in a free-kick in a 3–2 away defeat against Ross County. He made eleven appearances across the season, and a further in the play-off, as they kept their top-flight status.

Doncaster Rovers (loan)
On 29 October 2015, Grant joined League One club Doncaster Rovers on a one-month loan deal. Two days later he made his debut against Colchester United at the Keepmoat Stadium, opening a 2–0 win with a 20-yard strike. The loan was later extended till the end of the 2015–2016 season. On his return to Everton FC he played first team football during pre season.

Ipswich Town (loan)
Grant signed for Ipswich Town on a season-long loan on 4 August 2016, however he later returned to Everton on 18 November 2016.

Doncaster Rovers (loan)
After being released from Ipswich, on 2 January 2017 Grant once again signed for Doncaster for the remainder of the 2016–17 season. He was in the starting lineup against Stevenage on the same day, and opened up his goal account on 21 January by lashing a shot to the bottom corner from 18 yards out, the first in a 3–1 victory over Crewe.

Crewe Alexandra (loan)
On 30 August 2017, Grant signed for Crewe Alexandra on loan until 10 January 2018, and made his Crewe debut on 2 September 2017 against Grimsby Town but was stretchered off after 18 minutes following a head injury, and missed the next game as a result of the concussion suffered. At the end of his loan spell in January 2018, Grant returned to Everton.

Plymouth Argyle
On 7 June 2018, Grant signed for League One side Plymouth Argyle after his contract with Everton had expired. On 28 September 2019, he scored his first goal for the club with a 30-yard screamer in a 1–0 away win at Mansfield Town in League Two.

Career statistics

References

External links

1995 births
Living people
English footballers
Footballers from Liverpool
Association football wingers
Scottish Professional Football League players
English Football League players
Everton F.C. players
Motherwell F.C. players
Doncaster Rovers F.C. players
Ipswich Town F.C. players
Crewe Alexandra F.C. players
Plymouth Argyle F.C. players